Forty Stories collects forty of Donald Barthelme's short stories, several of which originally appeared in The New Yorker. The book was first published by G. P. Putnam's Sons in 1987.

While Sixty Stories includes many longer narratives, the stories in Forty Stories are pithy. Many last for fewer than five pages, and display Barthelme's flash fictional tendencies. They also abound in historical references and surreal juxtapositions. One story involves a World War I Secret Police investigator, a trio of German warplanes, and the artist Paul Klee. Another is a parodic rewriting of the fairy-tale Bluebeard, perhaps inspired by Angela Carter's story "The Bloody Chamber." Yet another consists of a single seven-page-long sentence (without a concluding period).

The following stories appear in the book:

 Chablis
 On the Deck
 The Genius
 Opening
 Sindbad
 The Explanation
 Concerning the Bodyguard
 RIF
 The Palace at Four A.M.
 Jaws
 Conversations with Goethe
 Affection
 The New Owner
 Paul Klee [full title: "Engineer-Private Paul Klee Misplaces an Aircraft Between Milbertshoffen and Cambrai, March 1916"]
 Terminus
 The Educational Experience
 Bluebeard
 Departures
 Visitors
 The Wound
 At the Tolstoy Museum
 The Flight of Pigeons from the Palace
 A Few Moments of Sleeping and Waking
 The Temptation of St. Anthony
 Sentence
 Pepperoni
 Some of Us Had Been Threatening Our Friend Colby
 Lightning
 The Catechist
 Porcupines at the University
 Sakrete
 Captain Blood
 110 West Sixty-first Street
 The Film
 Overnight to Many Distant Cities
 Construction
 Letters to the Editore
 Great Days
 The Baby
 January

Sixty Stories
Sixty Stories, a companion volume to Forty Stories, was published six years earlier, in 1981. It contains stories from Barthelme's first six collections.

1987 short story collections
American short story collections
G. P. Putnam's Sons books